Lupăria may refer to several villages in Romania:

 Lupăria, a village in Prăjeni Commune, Botoșani County
 Lupăria, a village in Cotnari Commune, Iași County
 Lupăria, a village in Ciolpani Commune, Ilfov County

and a village in Moldova:
 Lupăria, a village in Malinovscoe Commune, Rîșcani District

See also
 Lobera (disambiguation)
 Lobeira (disambiguation)